Buiceşti may refer to several villages in Romania:

 Buiceşti, a village in Butoiești Commune, Mehedinţi County
 Buiceşti, a village in Priseaca Commune, Olt County